Max Allwein (December 18, 1904 – November 20, 1977) was a German politician and jurist. He was a  representative of the Christian Social Union of Bavaria.
He was born in Munich and died in Bad Tölz.

See also
List of Bavarian Christian Social Union politicians

References

Christian Social Union in Bavaria politicians
1904 births
1977 deaths